Matthew B. Scannell (born February 10, 1970) is an American singer, songwriter, guitarist and multi-instrumentalist. Scannell is the lead vocalist, lead guitarist, primary songwriter, and founding member of the alternative rock band Vertical Horizon.

Background
Scannell is a native of Worcester, Massachusetts. He was given his first guitar when he was seven years old. Scannell attended high school at Deerfield Academy in Deerfield, Massachusetts. He enrolled at Georgetown University in Washington D.C. after graduation from high school.

Vertical Horizon
In 1990, Scannell and another Georgetown student, Keith Kane, formed Vertical Horizon. The two began performing in Washington clubs in October 1991. Scannell received a bachelor's degree in psychology from Georgetown University in 1992.

The duo released their first album, There and Back Again, in 1992 after graduation from Georgetown. Scannell has since appeared as the lead vocalist of all of Vertical Horizon's albums.

Other activities
Singer Richard Marx and Scannell collaborated to release the albums Duo in 2008 and Duo Live in 2010. On June 8, 2011, Scannell appeared at the Arcada Theatre in St. Charles, Illinois, with actor Hugh Jackman. Scannell and Jackman were invited to perform as guests of Marx.

References

External links
 Songfacts: Interview with Matt Scannell

Vertical Horizon
American pop rock singers
American rock guitarists
American male guitarists
American rock songwriters
American male singer-songwriters
Singer-songwriters from Massachusetts
Georgetown University alumni
Deerfield Academy alumni
Musicians from Worcester, Massachusetts
Living people
Guitarists from Massachusetts
1970 births
21st-century American singers